The Orient–Fosterville Border Crossing is an international border crossing between the towns of Orient, Maine, United States and Fosterville, New Brunswick, Canada on the Canada–US border.  At this crossing, the United States is still operating the original border station built in 1937, which was listed on the National Register of Historic Places in 2014.  Canada built its current border station in 1986.  This section of the border is a series of lakes and streams that supply the St Croix River.  The original bridge connecting Orient with Fosterville was said to be the shortest international bridge between the US and Canada.

Canadian facilities

The Canadian government built a border station here in about 1930.  The current station was built in 1986.

The Canadian station handles about 30 cars every day.

United States facilities

The United States facility is located on the north side of Boundary Road.  The main building is a -story brick-faced Colonial Revival structure, with a side-gable roof and a projecting one-lane hip-roofed porte-cochere.  The porte-cochere is supported by Classical Revival squared columns, with matching pilasters at the building front.  Stylistically similar wood-frame single-story wings extend the building to either side; that on the left houses restrooms, that on the right offices.  The interior of the main building is symmetrically organized, with customs on one side and immigration on the other.  A small garage, dating to the same period as the main building, stands to the northwest.

Prior to the construction of this station, customs and immigration formalities would have taken place in the nearest town.  With the advent of increased automobile traffic in the 1920s, as well as the need to interdict the movement of contraband liquor due to Prohibition, the federal government realized the need for border stations where immigration formalities and vehicle inspections could be performed close to the border, and consequently planned the construction of a series of such stations.  This building, built in 1937, is the least-altered of Maine's surviving early border stations.  It was built to a standard "Type 1" plan, one of three built on the Canada–US border, and is the only one of those still in use in Maine. Others of this style are still in operation in other states, including Morses Line, Vermont, and Alburg Springs, Vermont.

See also
 List of Canada–United States border crossings
 National Register of Historic Places listings in Aroostook County, Maine

References

Canada–United States border crossings
Transportation buildings and structures in Aroostook County, Maine
National Register of Historic Places in Maine
Transport in York County, New Brunswick
Buildings and structures in York County, New Brunswick
National Register of Historic Places in Aroostook County, Maine
1930 establishments in Maine
1930 establishments in New Brunswick